Chernivtsi Leonid Kadeniuk International Airport  is an airport in the city of Chernivtsi in western Ukraine.

History

Early history 
First scheduled flights in Chernivtsi commenced in 1928, on the route Bucharest – Iași – Cernăuți (as it was the name of the city in the interwar period, when it was part of the Kingdom of Romania). The flights were operated by SNNA (Serviciul Național de Navigație Aeriană, in 1930 renamed LARES - Romanian Air Lines Exploited by the State) using Farman F.168Bn4 aircraft.

The current airport was designed at the beginning of the 1930s, and inaugurated on 24 May 1933. The terminal building was designed by the Romanian architect Constantin Dragu.

An international route opened on 28 March 1937, when PLL LOT and LARES starting the operation of an air service between Palestine and Poland: Lydda – Rhodos – Athens – Thessaloniki – Sofia – Bucharest – Cernăuți – Lwow – Warsaw. Both airline companies operated their Lockheed L-10A Electra on this service, later supplemented by the Savoia-Marchetti SM.83. On 15 June 1938, the domestic route Cernăuți – Cluj – Arad was launched (operated with Lockheed Electra, Savoia-Marchetti S.73 and later Douglas B-23 Dragon aircraft).

Recent years
In 2016, scheduled operations were resumed by national carrier Ukraine International Airlines. The carrier inaugurated a route linking its hub in Kyiv-Boryspil with Chernivitsi on 12 July, initially operated on a daily basis with flights carried out by partner airline Dniproavia using their Embraer 145 fleet. In the end of 2017, UIA started using Embraer 190s.

At the end of 2017, the Ukrainian airline Yanair arrived at the airport with an audit. On 12 December, a major press conference was held at the City Council building, at which the company management announced that they were absolutely satisfied with the state of the airport and ready to continue cooperation with the airport. There was only one problem - the existing runway can not accept large aircraft. However, among the most promising destinations for scheduled and charter flights, Yanair sees Italy, Egypt, Finland, Georgia, Germany and Israel.

In 2017, the airport management began negotiations with Romanian low-cost carrier Blue Air. There are Boeing 737-500 aircraft in the airline fleet, which the airport can accept without restrictions in weight. There are ongoing negotiations between the airline and the airport.

In July 2018, the airport received a request from Wizz Air, but due to bad state of runway, they were unable to start flights to the airport.

In September 2018, the airport was named after Ukrainian astronaut Leonid Kadeniuk.

Airlines and destinations

The following airlines operate regular scheduled and charter flights at the airport:

Currently, all flights are suspended due to the 2022 Russian invasion of Ukraine.

Statistics

See also
 Bukovyna Airlines
 List of airports in Ukraine
 List of the busiest airports in Ukraine
 List of the busiest airports in Europe
 List of the busiest airports in the former USSR

References

External links
 Official website
 
 
 

Airports in Ukraine
Transport in Chernivtsi
Buildings and structures in Chernivtsi
Airports established in 1933
1933 establishments in Ukraine